The 2012–13 season is the 103rd season of competitive football in Germany.

Promotion and relegation

Pre Season

Post Season

Retirements

National teams

Germany national football team

2014 FIFA World Cup qualification

Friendlies

Germany women's national football team

UEFA Women's Euro 2013 qualifying

2013 Algarve Cup

Friendlies

League standings

Men

Bundesliga

2. Bundesliga

3. Liga

Women

Bundesliga

2. Bundesliga

North

South

German clubs in Europe

UEFA Champions League

Play-off round

Group stage

Group B

Group D

Group F

Knockout phase

Round of 16

Quarter-finals

Semi-finals

Final

UEFA Europa League

Third qualifying round

|}

Play-off Round

|}

Group stage

Group C

Group E

Group K

Group L

Knockout phase

Round of 32

|}

Round of 16

|}

UEFA Women's Champions League

Round of 32

|}

Round of 16

|}

Quarter-finals

|}

Semi-finals

|}

Final

Managerial changes

Managerial changes

Transfers
List of German football transfers summer 2012

Deaths
 19 July 2012 – Hans Nowak, 74, defender for FC Schalke 04, FC Bayern Munich, and Kickers Offenbach and member of the 1962 West Germany World Cup squad.
 11 October 2012 – Helmut Haller, 73, midfielder for FC Augsburg. A German international, Haller played 3 World Cups. Outside Germany, he won almost 200 Serie A caps in Italy.
 22 November 2012 – Raimund Krauth, 59, striker for Karlsruher SC, Eintracht Frankfurt, and FK Pirmasens.
 28 March 2013 – Heinz Patzig, 83, midfielder for Eintracht Braunschweig and others. After his playing career, he worked as Braunschweig's assistant manager for 27 straight seasons.
 7 April 2013 – Hans Jäcker, 80, goalkeeper for Eintracht Braunschweig.
 15 June 2013 – Heinz Flohe, 65, midfielder for 1. FC Köln and TSV 1860 Munich. He was a member of the 1974 World Cup champion West Germany squad as well as the 1976 Euro and 1978 World Cup squads.
 16 June 2013 – Ottmar Walter, 89, forward for 1. FC Kaiserslautern and others. He was a member of the 1954 World Cup champion West Germany squad.

Sources

 
Seasons in German football